The 1979–80 Scottish Cup was the 95th staging of Scotland's most prestigious football knockout competition. The Cup was won by Celtic who defeated Rangers in the final. The match was marred by crowd trouble which resulted in violent clashes between rival fans and led to the current ban on alcohol at Scottish grounds.

First round

Replays

Second Replays

Second round

Replays

Third round

Replays

Second Replays

Fourth round

Replays

Quarter-finals

Replays

Semi-finals

Final

See also
1979–80 in Scottish football
1979–80 Scottish League Cup

References

Scottish Cup seasons
Cup